Terry Edward Branstad (born November 17, 1946) is an American politician and former diplomat. A member of the Republican Party, he served three terms in the Iowa House of Representatives from 1973 to 1979 before serving as governor of Iowa from 1983 to 1999 and again from 2011 to 2017. Branstad served as the United States Ambassador to China from 2017 to 2020 under President Donald Trump.

Branstad served as the 39th governor of Iowa from 1983 to 1999. Following this initial retirement from politics, he served as President of Des Moines University, a private medical osteopathic school, from 2003 to 2009. In 2010, Branstad returned to Iowa politics, running for governor again and defeating Democratic incumbent Chet Culver to become the state's 42nd governor. His tenure of 22 years, 4 months, and 13 days makes him the longest-serving governor in American history, having surpassed George Clinton's record of 20 years, 11 months, and 2 days in December 2015.

In December 2016, Branstad accepted President Donald Trump's nomination to serve as the United States Ambassador to China. Branstad resigned as governor of Iowa on May 24, 2017 and was sworn in as the United States Ambassador to China on July 12, 2017. In 2020, Branstad resigned as Ambassador to China in order to work on President Trump's 2020 reelection campaign.

On January 24, 2023, it was announced that Branstad would take over as the new president of the World Food Prize Foundation.

Early life 
Branstad was born in Leland, Iowa. His father was Edward Arnold Branstad, a farmer; his mother was Rita (née Garland). Branstad's mother was Jewish, and his father a Norwegian American Lutheran. Branstad was raised Lutheran and later converted to Catholicism. He is a second cousin of US Attorney-General Merrick Garland.

Education 
Branstad received a Bachelor of Arts in political science from the University of Iowa in 1969 and a Juris Doctor from Drake University Law School in 1974. He was drafted after college and served in the United States Army from 1969 to 1971 as a military policeman in the 503rd Military Police Battalion at Fort Bragg. He was awarded the Army Commendation Medal for meritorious service; he once recalled that he arrested actress Jane Fonda for coming onto post at Arlington National Cemetery, where she was planning to attend an antiwar protest.

Early political career
Branstad served three terms in the Iowa House of Representatives from 1973 to 1979 and was the Lieutenant Governor of Iowa from 1979 to 1983, the year he was first elected governor.

Governor of Iowa

First tenure (1983–1999)

When elected governor at age 36, Branstad became the youngest chief executive in Iowa's history. Reelected in 1986, 1990, and 1994, he left office as Iowa's longest-serving governor. He served as Chairman of the National Governors Association in 1989–90, and also was Chair of the Midwestern Governors Association. In 1997 he chaired the Education Commission of the States, the Republican Governors Association, and the Governors' Ethanol Coalition.

In 1983 Branstad vetoed a bill to establish a state lottery.

Branstad made reinstatement of the death penalty a central focus of his 1994 re-election campaign; however, despite successfully being re-elected, he was unable to implement this policy due to opposition from Democrats in the Iowa State Senate.

Iowa's unemployment rate went from 8.5% when Branstad took office to a record low 2.5% by the time he left office in 1999. In his first year as governor, the state budget had a $90 million deficit. It took several years until the budget was balanced. Branstad said he did not have enough support in the legislature to approve budget reforms until 1992. By 1999 Iowa had an unprecedented $900 million budget surplus.

Inter-gubernatorial career

Branstad focused most of his efforts outside of politics after leaving office in early 1999. He founded Branstad and Associates, LLC and was also a partner in the firm of Kaufman, Pattee, Branstad & Miller and a financial advisor for Robert W. Baird and Co.

In August 2003 Branstad accepted an offer from Des Moines University to become its president. On October 16, 2009, he announced his retirement from Des Moines University to run again for governor.

President George W. Bush appointed Branstad to chair the President's Commission on Excellence in Special Education. The commission was charged with developing a plan to improve the educational performance of students with disabilities. After completing his work with the commission in 2003, Branstad was asked to serve as a member of the National Advisory Council for Positive Action for Teen Health, or PATH. The advisory council encourages action to detect adolescent mental illness. In April 2003 Branstad was named a public member of the American Institute of Certified Public Accountants, which comprises both professional and public members who address a variety of issues related to accounting.

Branstad serves on the boards of Conmed Health Management Inc, American Future Fund, the Iowa Health System, Liberty Bank, the American Institute of Certified Public Accountants, and Living History Farms.

Second tenure (2011–2017)

2010 gubernatorial election

On August 2, 2009, The Des Moines Register reported that Branstad was actively considering seeking the Republican nomination for governor. On October 7, Branstad filed papers to run for governor in the 2010 election. According to a September Des Moines Register poll, he maintained a 70% favorability rating from Iowans as compared to Governor Chet Culver's rating of 50%.

On June 8, 2010, Branstad won the Republican gubernatorial nomination, but when opposing candidate Bob Vander Plaats conceded, he did not endorse Branstad.

The Des Moines Tea Party gave Branstad a "no" on their report card regarding "criteria for acceptance" and said Branstad had "a history of raising taxes, [was] not a true conservative, increased the size of government every year he held office, [and] built a state-owned phone company." Former Iowa State Auditor Richard Johnson accused Branstad of keeping "two sets of books" on the state budget while governor. Johnson said Branstad needed to be "transparent" to Iowa voters about the reporting of Iowa's finances during his tenure as governor.

2014 gubernatorial election

Branstad ran for reelection in 2014. He was opposed in the Republican primary by Tom Hoefling, a political activist and nominee for president in 2012 for both America's Party and American Independent Party. Branstad won the primary with 83% of the vote.

In the general election, Branstad faced Democratic nominee State Senator Jack Hatch and won with 59% of the vote.

Voting rights 
Branstad rescinded an executive order by his predecessor Tom Vilsack that restored voting rights to approximately 115,000 felons who had completed their sentences. Iowa was the last remaining state to have felons permanently disenfranchised until 2020, when Branstad's successor, Kim Reynolds, restored voting rights for some felons who had completed their sentences.

Taxes 
In June 2013, Branstad signed into law a sweeping tax reform bill that had widespread bipartisan support, passing the Iowa Senate by 44 votes to 6 and the Iowa House by 84 votes to 13. The bill, Senate File 295, provided for the state's largest tax cut in history, including an estimated $4.4 billion in property tax reform and an estimated $90 million of annual income tax relief, in part in the form of an increase in the earned income tax credit. The bill also included significant reforms to education and health care.

Job creation ranking
A June 2013 Business Journals analysis of 45 of the country's 50 governors ranked Branstad 28th in job creation. The ranking was based on a comparison of the annual private sector growth rate in all 50 states using data from the U.S. Bureau of Labor Statistics.

Gun rights
On April 13, 2017, with large Republican majorities in the Iowa legislature, Branstad signed a bill into law expanding gun rights, enacting a stand-your-ground law, expanding the right of citizens to sue if they believe their Second Amendment rights are being infringed, and expanding the gun rights of minors, among several other provisions.

Discrimination lawsuit
On July 15, 2019, a jury in Polk County, Iowa awarded a gay former state official $1.5 million in damages, finding that Branstad had discriminated against him based on sexual orientation in 2012.

U.S. Ambassador to China 

In December 2016 President-elect Donald Trump chose Branstad to serve as US Ambassador to China, succeeding Max Baucus. Branstad accepted the offer within one day after meeting with Trump in New York. Trump cited Branstad's decades of experience with China while governor of Iowa. Xi Jinping, China's paramount leader, considers Branstad an "old friend". Branstad's relationship with Xi dates to 1985, when Xi, then a young official from Hebei Province, headed a five-man agricultural delegation to Iowa. Branstad's hearing before the U.S. Senate Foreign Relations Committee was held on May 2, 2017.

Branstad was confirmed by the Senate on May 22, 2017, in an 82 to 13 vote. He resigned as governor on May 24, 2017, in a ceremony at the Iowa State House, and was immediately sworn in as U.S. Ambassador to China. His appointment marked the third time in a decade that a politician resigned a statewide office to become the Ambassador to China; Jon Huntsman Jr. resigned as governor of Utah in 2009, and Max Baucus resigned as U.S. senator from Montana in 2014.

In May 2019, Branstad traveled to Tibet Autonomous Region amid heightening trade tensions between the United States and China. This diplomatic journey was designed to give the United States a better perception of Tibet and its people, cultural practices, and life.

Branstad stepped down as U.S. Ambassador to China in early October 2020.

Personal life 
Branstad married Christine Johnson on June 17, 1972. They have three children, Eric, Allison, and Marcus, and eight grandchildren. Christine has worked as a medical assistant and as a volunteer at schools and hospitals. Eric is a political consultant and lobbyist whose lobbying activities on behalf of Chinese firms while Branstad was US Ambassador to China led to charges with conflict of interest. Branstad denied the allegation. Allison moved to Beijing with her father when he was appointed ambassador because she landed a job at the International School of Beijing as a third grade teacher. Marcus was appointed by his father to the Iowa Natural Resources Commission in 2013 and works as a lobbyist for the American Chemistry Council.

Branstad is a member of the Ancient and Accepted Scottish Rite of Freemasonry. He received the honor of "Knight Commander of the Court of Honor" in 2015.

In 2015 longtime newspaperman and Iowa historian Mike Chapman published a biography of Branstad, Iowa's Record-Setting Governor: The Terry Branstad Story. The book details Branstad's youth on the family farm, his high school days in Forest City, and his rise in politics.

Electoral history
 1972 election for Iowa House of Representatives District 8:
 Terry Branstad (R), 59.0%
 Elmer Selbrand (D), 41.0%
 1974 election for Iowa House of Representatives District 8:
 Terry Branstad (R), 68.7%
 Jean Haugland (D), 31.3%
 1976 election for Iowa House of Representatives District 8:
 Terry Branstad (R), 70.4%
 Franklin Banwart (D), 29.6%
 1978 Republican primary election for Lieutenant Governor of Iowa:
 Terry Branstad, 42.1%
 Hansen, 32.7%
 Oakley, 25.2%
 1978 election for Lieutenant Governor of Iowa:
 Terry Branstad (R), 57.7%
 William Palmer (D), 42.3%
 1982 election for Governor of Iowa:
1982 General Election:
Terry Branstad (R), 52.8%
Roxanne Conlin (D), 46.6%
Marcia Farrington (L), 0.3%
Jim Bittner (S), 0.3%
 1986 election for Governor of Iowa:
1986 General Election:
Terry Branstad (R), 51.9%
Lowell Junkins (D), 48.0%
 1990 election for Governor of Iowa:
1990 General Election:
Terry Branstad (R), 60.6%
Donald Avenson (D), 38.8%
Bailey/Nelson (SW), 0.4%
 1994 election for Governor of Iowa:Republican PrimaryTerry Branstad (R), 51.8%
Fred Grandy (R), 48.1%1994 General Election:Terry Branstad (R), 56.8%
Bonnie Campbell (D), 41.6%
Hughes/Davis (Petition), 0.6%
Butler/Stone (NL), 0.4%
Olsen/Carey (L), 0.3%
Galati/Pena (SW), 0.1%
 2010 election for Governor of Iowa:Republican PrimaryTerry Branstad (R), 114,290 votes, 50.4%
Bob Vander Plaats (R), 92,759, 40.9%
Rod Roberts (R), 19,916, 8.8%2010 General Election:Terry Branstad (R), 52.9%
Chet Culver (D), 43.1%
Jonathan Narcisse (I), 1.3%
Eric Cooper (L), 1.3%
James Hughes (I), 0.3%
David Rosenfeld (SW), 0.2%
Write-Ins, 0.2%
 2014 election for Governor of Iowa:Republican Primary:Terry Branstad (R), 129,752 votes, 79.8%
Tom Hoefling (R), 16.2%
Write-Ins, 0.2%2014 General Election:'''
Terry Branstad (R), 59.1%
Jack Hatch (D), 37.3%
Lee Deakins Hieb (L), 1.8%
Jim Hennager (I), 0.9%
Jonathan Narcisse (I), 0.9%
Write-ins, 0.1%

Notes

References

External links
 
 Ambassador Terry Branstad biography
 Terry Branstad for Governor
 

|-

|-

|-

|-

|-

|-

|-

|-

|-

1946 births
21st-century American diplomats
20th-century American politicians
21st-century American politicians
Ambassadors of the United States to China
American Freemasons
American people of Jewish descent
American people of Norwegian descent
Heads of universities and colleges in the United States
Converts to Roman Catholicism from Lutheranism
Des Moines University people
Republican Party governors of Iowa
Iowa lawyers
Lieutenant Governors of Iowa
Living people
Republican Party members of the Iowa House of Representatives
Military personnel from Iowa
People from Boone County, Iowa
People from Winnebago County, Iowa
United States Army soldiers
University of Iowa alumni
Trump administration personnel
Catholics from Iowa
Drake University Law School alumni